The Canon EOS 5D Mark II is a 21.1 effective megapixel full-frame CMOS digital single-lens reflex camera made by Canon, the first Canon EOS camera to have video recording capabilities. It succeeds the EOS 5D and was announced on 17 September 2008.

On 2 March 2012, Canon announced the camera's successor: the Canon EOS 5D Mark III.  On 24 December 2012, Canon Japan moved the camera to their "Old Products" list, effectively discontinuing the camera.

Improvements over original EOS 5D

New features
 Movie recording full HD at 1920 × 1080 and SDTV at 640 × 480 resolution.
 Monaural microphone for audio during video recording, speaker for playback and microphone jack for external stereo microphone
 Live preview with ExpSim LV "exposure simulation" live preview (full exposure preview control utilizing ExpSim LV, a first for video in a DSLR)
 Live preview with contrast-detect autofocus
 HDMI video output for live preview or playing clips and images on an external monitor via Type C MiniHDMI port
 Dust reduction system to perform automatic sensor cleaning
 Battery management software

The 5D Mark II is the first camera in the EOS line to provide video recording functions. Still photography during video recording is possible, but the camera suspends recording video until the final still frame is captured.

The lithium-ion battery for the 5D Mark II (LP-E6) has an 1800 mAh capacity. Each battery contains a microchip with a unique identifier for reporting charge status and battery health for display on the camera. The 5D Mark II's "Battery Info" screen can track battery health and shooting history for up to six LP-E6 batteries.

The camera has native ISO values of 100 multiplied by a power of 2; other ISO values are obtained by a digital exposure push (ISO values that are multiples of 125) or digital exposure pull (ISO values that are multiples of 160). The digital exposure push ISO is 1/3 stop greater than the native ISO, and a digital exposure pull ISO is 1/3 stop less than the native ISO. The digital exposure push ISO settings produce more noise than the native settings with a reduced dynamic range, and the digital exposure pull ISO settings produce less noise than the native settings.

Video recording

While the Nikon D90 was the first DSLR to shoot 720p high-definition video, and the Panasonic GH1, a MILC, was capable of 1080p/24 recording before the 5D Mark II officially gained this capability, the latter was the first full-frame DSLR to feature 1080p video recording. With these features, Canon 5D Mark II was able to compete with high-end digital movie cameras available that time. Its release started the trend of "DSLR revolution", significantly changing the world of independent filmmaking for upcoming years.
The Canon PowerShot SX 1 IS followed with 1080p video in a bridge digital camera soon after.

The 16:9 aspect ratio portion of the sensor used in video mode is similar in sensitive area to a VistaVision 8/35 frame. This large sensor allows videos to be recorded with very shallow depth of field for a "film look". The 21 megapixel sensor is downsampled to HD resolution by only using every third line and 4:2:0 chroma subsampling, leading to concern about Moiré patterns in recorded video.

Video clips can be up to 4 GB in size, approximately 12 minutes of 1080p HD or 24 minutes of SD (640 x 480) footage. These limits stem from the 4 GB maximum file size supported by the FAT32 filesystem format used on Compact Flash cards. The camera also imposes a hard maximum clip length of 29 minutes 59 seconds if the 4 GB limit has not already been reached. Video and audio is recorded to QuickTime (MOV) container files with H.264/MPEG-4 (Base Profile @ L5) compressed video and uncompressed 48 kHz/16-bit PCM audio. The bitrate for 1080p is approximately 38 megabits per second (4.8 MByte/s), while for SD it is approximately 17 megabits per second (2.2 MByte/s). Although the internal microphone is mono, stereo audio is supported through the audio input jack. When recording for long periods, especially in warmer climates, increased video noise may occur due to CMOS overheating. Rolling shutter, a phenomenon where vertical lines look bent on moving objects, when the camera is in motion is a significant issue with the Canon 5D Mark II.

Video functionality
The EOS 5D Mark II is capable of video recording in low-light situations and it is sold for a relatively low price, compared with professional video cameras. For the first eighteen months of its release, the camera only had a 30 frame per second (30p) video mode. On 15 March 2010, Canon released a firmware upgrade to add a 25p mode for PAL format compatibility and a 24p mode for compatibility with motion picture film cameras.
The firmware update also modified the 30p mode to record 29.97 frame/s and the new 24p mode actually records 23.976 frame/s to have frame rates compatible with NTSC. Lastly, the update added manual control of the audio record levels and an official way to disable the automatic gain control.

Following the success of the Canon Hack Development Kit (CHDK) for Canon's PowerShot cameras, third party firmware add-on was also produced for the 5D Mark II. The Magic Lantern firmware add-on provides many additional video and cinematography related controls and meters such as false colors, and zebra stripes for exposure control, depth of field estimates via peaking filters, audio VU meters and disables the automatic gain control on the microphone input (manual gain control for microphone input has since been added to Canon's official firmware, as noted above). It also provides a stable output of uncompressed 14-Bit RAW video data onto fast UDMA 7 CF cards at almost HD resolution (1004p vs. 1080p at Full HD).

Independent film and television
Notable film and television productions that used the Canon 5D Mark II include (in order of release):
 The BBC coverage of the Grand Prix Snooker in the first week of September 2009 was the first BBC programme to use the camera.
 The opening title sequence for the 35th season of NBC's Saturday Night Live, first broadcast on 26 September 2009. The camera, alongside the Canon 7D, was used due to its size, which allowed covert shooting on the streets of New York City, and depth of field capabilities, making it a suitable substitute for the series' usual 35mm film.
 The music video for the Japanese band Sakanaction's song "Aruku Around" (2010),a winning entry of the 14th Japan Media Arts Festival, was shot in a single take with a Canon EOS 5D Mark II camera.
 The House episode "Help Me", broadcast by Fox on 17 May 2010, was shot entirely on the Canon 5D Mark II, replacing the drama's usual 35mm film format. Portions of the seventh season were also recorded with a 5D Mark II.
 The BBC Two comedy series Shelfstackers, first broadcast on 4 September 2010, is the first BBC programme to be entirely shot on the camera. The corporation had initially refused its use due to "lack of quality" but were persuaded otherwise by the series' director, Dom Bridges. All six episodes of the series were shot on the camera for a total budget of £160,000.
 The Road to Coronation Street, broadcast by BBC Four on 16 September 2010, is the first UK television drama to be shot on the Canon 5D Mark II. The drama's director of photography was impressed and plans to use the camera on the seventh series of the BBC One drama Hustle.
 The 2011 short film Scenes from the Suburbs directed by Spike Jonze used a version of the camera modified to use Panavision lenses to shoot all of the night scenes alongside 35mm film used for the day scenes.
 The re-booted Hawaii Five-0 TV series is currently shot using Canon 5DmkII.
 Behzat Ç. Bir Ankara Polisiyesi, a Turkish TV series is being shot on Canon 5DmkII.
 The 2012 film Act of Valor was shot with the use of the Canon 5D Mark II.
 Dimensions, a multi-award-winning 2011 British period sci-fi feature film, was shot using Canon 5D Mark II for 'less than the price of Batman's cape'.
 Marvel's The Avengers is reported to have some Canon 5D MkII shots.
 Department, a 2012 Bollywood movie, is reported to have been shot using Canon 5D Mark II
 ParaNorman, a 2012 3D stop-motion animated adventure horror film produced by LAIKA, Inc., was shot on sixty Canon 5D Mark II cameras.
 Frances Ha, a 2012 American comedy-drama film shot by cinematographer Sam Levy, was filmed in digital black and white using a Canon 5d Mark II.
 Nirel, First International Tulu movie, directed by Ranjith Bajpe, is reported to have been shot using Canon 5D Mark II.
 Escape from Tomorrow, a 2013 feature film, was shot guerilla-style with two Canon 5D Mark II cameras at the Disney theme parks.
 Barack Obama's 2009 presidential portrait was taken on a Canon 5D Mark II, making it the first official presidential portrait taken with a digital camera.

Software
The included software package contains the following:

 Digital Photo Professional
 ZoomBrowser EX / ImageBrowser
 PhotoStitch
 EOS Utility
 Picture Style Editor

Firmware updates

References

External links

 Canon EOS 5D Mark II – Canon USA
 Canon EOS 5D Mark II  – EOS website (Japanese)
 Specifications sheet – Canon UK
 Canon EOS 5D Mark II In-depth Review – February 2009 at Digital Photography Review
 
 Canon 5D Mark II video performance review

5D Mark II
Live-preview digital cameras
Cameras introduced in 2008
Full-frame DSLR cameras